The Laurentian Hotel was a 1000-room hotel on Dorchester Street, now René Lévesque Boulevard, in Montreal, Quebec, Canada. The hotel was built in 1948 and demolished in 1978. The building was designed by Charles Davis Goodman, who was the architect of a number of prominent Streamline Moderne structures in the city, including the Jewish General Hospital and Bens De Luxe Delicatessen & Restaurant.

The Canadian Pacific proposed a new development for the site of the hotel in the late 1970s, and it was subsequently demolished in 1978. At the time, it was the largest hotel ever demolished in Canada. The La Laurentienne Building now stands on the site of the former hotel.

References

Demolished buildings and structures in Montreal
Defunct hotels in Canada
Art Deco architecture in Canada
Hotel buildings completed in 1948
Hotels in Montreal
Streamline Moderne architecture in Canada
Downtown Montreal
Buildings and structures demolished in 1978
Former skyscrapers
Demolished hotels